November 10 - Eastern Orthodox liturgical calendar - November 12

All fixed commemorations below celebrated on November 24 by Eastern Orthodox Churches on the Old Calendar.

For November 11th, Orthodox Churches on the Old Calendar commemorate the Saints listed on October 29.

Saints
 Martyrs Victor and Stephanida (Corona), at Damascus (160)
 Great-martyr Menas of Egypt (304)
 Martyr Vincent of Spain (Vincent of Saragossa) (304)
 Martyr Drakonas of Arauraka in Armenia, by beheading (304)
 Venerable Theodore the Confessor (Theodore the Studite), Abbot of the Studion (826)

Pre-Schism Western saints
 Saints Valentine, Felician and Victorinus, martyrs venerated in Ravenna in Italy (c. 305)  (see also: November 13)
 Saint Martin the Merciful (Martin of Tours), Bishop of Tours (397)  (see also: October 12, November 12 - East, July 4)
 Saint Veranus, Bishop of Lyons in France (5th century)
 Saint Cynfran, founder of a church in Gwynedd in Wales where there is also a holy well (5th century)
 Saint Rhediw, a saint recalled by the dedication of a church in Llanllyfni in North Wales.
 Saint Mennas, a Greek from Asia Minor who became a hermit in the Abruzzi in Italy, probably in Santomenna (6th century)
 Saint Bertuin, born in England, he became a monk at Othelle, then a bishop, and founded the monastery of Malonne Abbey near Namur in Belgium (c. 698)
 Saint Bartholomew the Younger, of Rossano, Calabria (c. 1054)

Post-Schism Orthodox saints
 Saint Nicodemus the Younger, of Beroea in Macedonia (c. 1305)
 Great-martyr Stephen-Urosh III of Decani (1331)
 Blessed Euthymius and Nestor, of Dečani (14th century)
 Saint Neophytus and Saint Stephen Urosica, of Serbia (14th century)
 Saint Milica of Serbia, Princess of Serbia (Eugenia in schema) (1405)
 Blessed Maximus of Moscow, Fool-for-Christ, Wonderworker (1434)
 Saint Martyrius, founder of Zelenets Monastery, Novgorod (1603)  (see also: March 1 )

New martyrs and confessors
 Martyrs of Zelenetsk (1927): 
 Hegumen Victor with the brotherhood.
 New Hieromartyr Eugene Vasiliev, Priest (1937)

Other commemorations
 Synaxis of the Saints of Dečani.
 Repose of Victor Sadkovsky, Archbishop of Chernigov (1803)
 Repose of Metropolitan Platon (Levshin) of Moscow (1812)
 Myrrh-streaming "Montreal" Iveron Icon of the Theotokos (1982)

Icon gallery

Notes

References

Sources
 November 11/November 24. Orthodox Calendar (PRAVOSLAVIE.RU).
 November 24 / November 11. HOLY TRINITY RUSSIAN ORTHODOX CHURCH (A parish of the Patriarchate of Moscow).
 November 11. OCA - The Lives of the Saints.
 The Autonomous Orthodox Metropolia of Western Europe and the Americas (ROCOR). St. Hilarion Calendar of Saints for the year of our Lord 2004. St. Hilarion Press (Austin, TX). p. 84.
 The Eleventh Day of the Month of November. Orthodoxy in China.
 November 11. Latin Saints of the Orthodox Patriarchate of Rome.
 The Roman Martyrology. Transl. by the Archbishop of Baltimore. Last Edition, According to the Copy Printed at Rome in 1914. Revised Edition, with the Imprimatur of His Eminence Cardinal Gibbons. Baltimore: John Murphy Company, 1916. pp. 347–348.
 Rev. Richard Stanton. A Menology of England and Wales, or, Brief Memorials of the Ancient British and English Saints Arranged According to the Calendar, Together with the Martyrs of the 16th and 17th Centuries. London: Burns & Oates, 1892. pp. 534–535.
Greek Sources
 Great Synaxaristes:  11 ΝΟΕΜΒΡΙΟΥ. ΜΕΓΑΣ ΣΥΝΑΞΑΡΙΣΤΗΣ.
  Συναξαριστής. 11 Νοεμβρίου. ECCLESIA.GR. (H ΕΚΚΛΗΣΙΑ ΤΗΣ ΕΛΛΑΔΟΣ).
  11/11/2016. Ορθόδοξος Συναξαριστής. 
Russian Sources
  24 ноября (11 ноября). Православная Энциклопедия под редакцией Патриарха Московского и всея Руси Кирилла (электронная версия). (Orthodox Encyclopedia - Pravenc.ru).
  11 ноября по старому стилю  /  24 ноября по новому стилю. Русская Православная Церковь - Православный церковный календарь на 2016 год.

November in the Eastern Orthodox calendar